Aeschremon is a genus of moths of the family Crambidae.

Species
Aeschremon conchylialis (Christoph, 1872)
Aeschremon desertalis Asselbergs, 2008
Aeschremon disparalis (Herrich-Schäffer, 1851)
Aeschremon kabylalis (Rebel, 1902)
Aeschremon ochrealis Asselbergs, 2008
Aeschremon similis Asselbergs, 2008
Aeschremon tenalis Amsel, 1961

References

 Asselbergs (2008). Arthropod fauna of the United Arab Emirates

Odontiini
Crambidae genera
Taxa named by Julius Lederer